Henry Freshfield may refer to:
Henry Ray Freshfield (1814–1895), British lawyer and mountaineer
Jane Freshfield (1814–1901), described as Mrs Henry Freshfield, British travel writer